The Beneficent Spiritist Center União do Vegetal (or UDV) is a religious society founded on July 22, 1961 in Porto Velho (Rondônia) by José Gabriel da Costa, known as Mestre Gabriel. The UDV seeks to promote peace and to "work for the evolution of the human being in the sense of his or her spiritual development", as is written in its bylaws. The institution today has over 18,000 members, distributed among more than 200 local chapters located in all the states of Brazil, as well as in Peru, Australia, several countries in Europe, and the United States. The translation of União do Vegetal is Union of the Plants referring to the sacrament of the UDV, Hoasca tea, also known as Ayahuasca.

In its sessions, UDV members drink Hoasca tea for the effect of mental concentration. In Brazil, the use of Hoasca in religious rituals was regulated by the Brazilian federal government's National Drug Policy Council on January 25, 2010. The policy established legal norms for the religious institutions that responsibly use this tea. The Supreme Court of the United States unanimously affirmed the UDV's right to use Hoasca tea in its religious sessions in the United States, in a decision published on February 21, 2006.

U.S. Supreme Court case 

Hoasca tea made from Banisteriopsis caapi and Psychotria viridis (the only two ingredients used in the UDV's preparation of Hoasca) was shipped to the American membership from Brazil. U.S. Customs agents seized a shipment and raided a UDV member's office, finding over 30 gallons of Hoasca tea in 1999. The UDV sued in 2000, seeking exemption from the Controlled Substances Act and equal treatment under the law.

In 2001, the 10th Circuit Court of New Mexico granted a preliminary injunction preventing the government from interfering with UDV's religious use of Hoasca. The government appealed and the appeals court stayed the injunction of the lower court. In December 2004, the Supreme Court lifted a stay thereby allowing the church to use Hoasca tea in their sessions. The Supreme Court heard oral arguments for the case on November 1, 2005.

On February 21, 2006, the Supreme Court issued its ruling on the case. The court ruled, unanimously, that the lower courts had not erred in holding that the federal government had failed to prove the "compelling interest" in barring UDV use of Hoasca required under the Religious Freedom Restoration Act. Chief Justice John Roberts wrote the opinion in the case, in the second opinion he authored as a member of the Court.

One of the active compounds of Hoasca is DMT, which is produced by the human body and in many plants. DMT is classified in the United States as a Schedule I drug. Plants, animals, and humans containing DMT are not. Neither Banisteriopsis caapi nor Psychotria viridis are listed in any schedule of the Controlled Substances Act.

Health of UDV members 
A study of UDV members by psychiatrist Charles Grob of the UCLA School of Medicine found them to be psychologically and physically healthier than average, and he has recommended ayahuasca as a treatment for depression.

See also 
Freedom of thought
Freedom of religion in the United States
Irmandade Beneficente Natureza Divina
Santo Daime

Notes

References 
 Grob C.S. et al. (1996) "Human Psychopharmacology of Hoasca, a Plant Hallucinogen used in Ritual Context in Brazil" draft paper for the Journal of Nervous and Mental Disease
 FAGUNDES, André. O Direito Penal e as minorias religiosas hoasqueiras (ayahuasqueiras) na Espanha. Comentários à decisão judicial da 4ª Seção da audiência provincial de Valência, processo n. 46250370042016100256. In: Derechos humanos desde la interdisciplinariedad en Ciencias Sociales y Humanidades. DÍAS, R. L. S. et al. (eds.) Madrid: Dykinson, 2020. p. 93-110.

External links

Official site of the UDV 
Official Site of the UDV in the US
Official blog of the UDV 
Religious Freedom, the US Supreme Court and the UDV
The Extraordinary Case of the United States vs. the União do Vegetal Church

Psychedelic drug advocates
Religious organizations using entheogens
Christian new religious movements
Religious organizations established in 1961
1961 establishments in Brazil
Religious syncretism in Brazil
Spiritism
Psychedelics and religion
Ayahuasca